Wrath or anger, usually associated with violence, violent reaction or acting out.   

Wrath may also refer to:

Music
Wrath Records, UK independent record label
Wrath (band), an American progressive thrash metal band
Wrath (Iris album), 2005
Wrath (Lamb of God album), 2009
"The Wrath", a song by Vader from the album De Profundis

Film and television
Wrath (1917 film), an American silent drama film
Wrath (2011 film), an Australian horror film written and directed by Jonathan N. Dixon
The Wrath, a 2018 South Korean horror film
"Wrath" (Fear the Walking Dead), a television episode
"Wrath" (The Walking Dead), a television episode
"Wrath", an episode of Law & Order: Special Victims Unit (season 3)

Other entertainment
Wrath (comics), two fictional supervillains (1984 and 2008)
Wrath, a character in the Fullmetal Alchemist anime and manga
Wrath: Aeon of Ruin, a 2019 video game
Bryan Clark (born 1964), wrestler who used the ring name Wrath

Other
Greater Wrath 1714–21 and Lesser Wrath 1741–43, Russian occupation of Eastern part of Sweden i.e. Finland
Wrath, one of the Seven deadly sins in Roman Catholic doctrine
Western Rail Approach to Heathrow

See also
 - includes many "Wrath of ... " titles
Cape Wrath
Mass destruction (disambiguation)
Rage (disambiguation)
Outrage (disambiguation)
Rage as an emotion
Fury (disambiguation)
Rath (disambiguation)
Wraith (disambiguation)